Actenoncus ater is a species of beetles in the family Carabidae, the only species in the genus Actenoncus.

References

Orthogoniinae
Monotypic Carabidae genera